"The Black Abbot of Puthuum" is a short story by American author Clark Ashton Smith as part of his Zothique cycle, and first published in the March 1936 issue of Weird Tales.

Plot
In Yoros, Zobal the archer and Cushara the pike-bearer are assigned by king Hoaraph to retrieve the maiden Rubalsa from Izdrel for the king's harem. They are accompanied by the eunuch Simban. While they retrieve Rubalsa and head off for Yoros, a darkness envelops them. Surrounded by darkness, strange sounds haunt them. Eventually they are met by a black man Ujuk, who is an abbot for the monastery Puthuum. Ujuk invites them to a feast, but Zobal and Cushara are skeptical of his intentions. Later that night, Zobal finds an animate mummy named Uldor. Uldor tells Zobal he was the last survivor of a monastery. However, in the final days, Uldor was visited by a lamia and they had a son, Ujuk. Uldor pleads with Zobal to kill Ujuk. Zobal does this and Puthuum disappears. Meanwhile, Sibman dies. Deciding this is outside the deal the king made with them, Zobal and Cushara draw lots to decide who will take Rubalsa for their own. Instead, Rubalsa chooses Cushara.

Themes
In the 1988 book Fantasy: The 100 Best Books, James Cawthorn and Michael Moorcock noted the stories "Necromancy in Naat", "The Witchcraft of Ulua", and "The Black Abbot of Puthuum" on the theme of love and lust.

See also 
Clark Ashton Smith bibliography

References

External links

Text of "The Black Abbot of Puthuum"

Short stories by Clark Ashton Smith
Fantasy short stories
1936 short stories
Works originally published in Weird Tales